Darcy Paquet (born 1972) is an American film critic, university lecturer, author and actor. In 2010, Paquet was awarded the Korea Film Reporters Association Award at the 15th Busan International Film Festival for his contributions in introducing Korean cinema to the world. Paquet was also the founder and organiser of Wildflower Film Awards Korea which presents the Wildflower Film Awards.

Education 
Paquet, a Massachusetts native, majored in Russian language at Carleton College in Minnesota and had a Master in Applied Linguistics at Indiana University.

Career 
Having made many Korean friends in graduate school, Paquet went to Seoul in 1997 to teach English at Korea University and had planned to stay briefly before going to the Czech Republic.

Since 1998, Paquet became a special advisor and English editor for the Korean Film Council.

In 1999, Paquet created the website (Koreanfilm.org) to introduce Korean films, which he is now most notable to foreigners. 

From 2003 to 2011, Paquet also wrote a monthly column for Korean film weekly Cine21.

In 2009, Paquet published a book, New Korean cinema : breaking the waves, about the changes in Korean cinema from the 1980s to 2000s.

During the 15th Busan International Film Festival in 2010, Paquet was awarded the Korea Film Reporters Association Award for his contributions in introducing Korean cinema to the world.

In 2019, Paquet was the English subtitle translator for the film Parasite by Bong Joon-ho. He was later appointed a honorary citizen of Busan.

Personal life 
Paquet met Yeon Hyeon-sook in 1998 and married after dating for three years. They have two sons.

Filmography

Film

Television series

Bibliography

References

External links 
 
 
 
 

1971 births
American film critics
Living people
Carleton College alumni
Indiana University alumni
American expatriates in South Korea
Korean–English translators